The Ruf Turbo R, sometimes stylized as TurboR, is a sports car built by Ruf Automobile of Germany. It is based on the 993 generation Porsche 911 Turbo. It was introduced in 1998 after the discontinuation of the CTR2 (another 993 generation based car), however Ruf still wanted a supercar offering to be available and so the Turbo R became the supercar offering from Ruf for the 1998 model year and endured a very short production run of only one year.

Specifications 
Computer-controlled all-wheel drive is standard and power is sent to the wheels through a 6-speed manual transmission. The suspension was modified with firmer springs and larger anti-roll bars to accommodate the extra power and the brakes were reworked by Ruf as well. On the exterior the Turbo R is differentiated by a Ruf body kit, 18 inch wheels, aero mirrors and removed rain gutters. In the interior, the same integrated roll cage from the CTR2 and the lightweight interior from the BTR were both offered as options.

Turbo R Limited 

In 2016 Ruf introduced the Turbo R Limited, a tribute to the original Turbo R with production limited to seven units, all of which sold, and prices starting at slightly under US$600,000. Unlike the original, the Limited comes standard with rear-wheel drive, with all-wheel drive offered as an option.

References

External links 

 PistonHeads review of the Turbo R.

Turbo R
Cars powered by boxer engines
Rear-engined vehicles
Cars introduced in 1998
Cars introduced in 2016